Trichoneura is a genus of crane fly in the family Limoniidae.

References 
 

Limoniidae